John Dan Kemp Jr. (born September 8, 1951) is an American lawyer and jurist who is the chief justice of the Arkansas Supreme Court.

Born in Batesville, Arkansas, Kemp attended Mountain View High School and received his undergraduate degree from the University of Arkansas in 1973, followed by a Juris Doctor from the University of Arkansas School of Law in 1976. While attending the University of Arkansas, he was a member of the Gamma Upsilon Chapter of Sigma Nu Fraternity. Kemp was a city judge and city attorney in Mountain View before being elected as a circuit judge in Stone County, Arkansas in 1986, which position he held for 29 years.

In 2015, Kemp decided to challenge sitting Justice Courtney Hudson for the Chief Justice position. Kemp defeated Hudson to win the seat.

References

1951 births
20th-century American lawyers
20th-century American judges
21st-century American judges
Arkansas lawyers
Justices of the Arkansas Supreme Court
Chief Justices of the Arkansas Supreme Court
Living people
People from Batesville, Arkansas
University of Arkansas School of Law alumni